The Siola d'oro ("Golden Swallow") is a biennial opera prize awarded in Gatteo since 1983, in memory of Lina Pagliughi.

The award has been given to: Luciana Serra, June Anderson, Mariella Devia, Denia Mazzola, Enedina Lloris, Sumi Jo, Valeria Esposito, Patrizia Ciofi (1997), Jessica Pratt (soprano), Elizabeth Vidal, Stefania Bonfadelli, Annick Massis, Elena Mosuc, Pretty Yende.

References

External links
 Association of the Siola d'Oro

Classical music awards
European music awards